Dustbowl is a studio album by the rock band Head of David. It was released in 1988 through Blast First. The song "Dog Day Sunrise" was covered by industrial metal band Fear Factory on their 1995 album Demanufacture.

Track listing
All Music and Lyrics by Head of David.

Personnel

Band
 Dave Cochrane – bass guitar
 Justin K Broadrick – drums
 Eric Jurenovskis – guitars
 Stephen R. Burroughs – vocals

Technical staff
 Steve Albini – producer

References

1988 albums
Albums produced by Steve Albini
Blast First albums
Head of David albums